Provident Bank may refer to:

 Provident Bank of Maryland
 Provident Bank of New Jersey

See also
 Provident Bank Park, former name of Clover Stadium, a stadium in Pomona, New York
 Provident National Bank, a predecessor of PNC Financial Services